Selections from Burmese Folk Tales is a book written by Htin Aung (also known by his penname, Maung Htin Aung).
Oxford University Press, Amen House, London E.C.4

First published 1951
Reprinted (three times) 1951
Reprinted (twice) 1952
Reprinted (six times) 1955
Reprinted 1956

Printed in India by V.N. Bhattacharya, M.A., at the Inland Printing Works, 60/3 Dharamtala Street, Calcutta-13 and published by Geoffrey Cumberlege, Oxford University Press, Calcutta-1

References

Maung Htin Aung (1956), Selections from Burmese Folk Tales, Oxford University Press

1951 books
Books about Myanmar
Burmese folklore